The Shadow is a 1933 British mystery film directed by George A. Cooper and starring Henry Kendall, Elizabeth Allan and Felix Aylmer.

Cast
 Henry Kendall as Reggie Ogden
 Elizabeth Allan as Sonia Bryant
 Felix Aylmer as Sir Richard Bryant
 Jeanne Stuart as Moya Silverton
 Cyril Raymond as Silverton
 Viola Compton as Mrs. Bascomb
 John Turnbull as Detective Inspector Carr
 Ralph Truman as Elliot  
 Dennis Cowles as Chief Inspector Fleming  
 Vincent Holman as Wallis  
 James Raglan as Beverley Kent  
 Gordon Begg as Willit  
 Charles Carson as Sir Edward Hulme KC

Plot
The Shadow (not the pulp character) buys secret letters and such and uses them for blackmail. He also kills. The police have been after him for the last 12 months. A car breaks down near a large  isolated house, with the man and woman in it planning to rob the house which is owned by a top police officer (Felix Aylmer). There is a very heavy fog which prevents anyone leaving the house.

After his last murder, The Shadow left a clue behind. A police officer is killed by The Shadow before he can reveal his identity but the law knows that The Shadow is one of the numerous people in the house as he kills another to hide his identity, trying to get the clue back.

More cops arrive and surround the house. The key to the safe where the clue is hidden is stolen as the police close in on The Shadow. Telephone wires are cut and lights are turned off allowing The Shadow to escape detection. Shots are fired at the police. But a woman has recognised the clue and knows who The Shadow is. Will she live to tell his secret?

References

External links 

1933 films
British mystery films
1933 mystery films
British black-and-white films
British films based on plays
Films shot at Twickenham Film Studios
Films directed by George A. Cooper
Films set in London
1930s English-language films
1930s British films